Kazys Ladiga (25 December 1893 in Iškonys near Biržai – 19 December 1941 in Irkutsk) was a Lithuanian general and one of the first volunteer officers of the Lithuanian army.

Upon graduating from the Military Academy in Vilnius, Ladiga served in the Imperial Russian army during World War I and earned the rank of captain. He returned to Lithuania in 1918 and volunteered to the newly formed Lithuanian army. He was appointed as the commander of one of the battalions of the 1st Infantry Regiment. Ladiga quickly rose through the ranks and commanded the Vilkmergė Group in the Lithuanian–Soviet War. He also led units against the Bermontians and in the Polish–Lithuanian War. After an unsuccessful campaign in September 1920, Ladiga resigned field office and joined the General Staff in Kaunas. After the Lithuanian Wars of Independence he continued military studies in Switzerland and Czechoslovakia. He rose to the rank of a general and briefly served as the Chief of the General Staff in 1925–1926. He was forced to retire from active military duty after the military coup of December 1926.

When Lithuania was occupied by the Soviet Union in June 1940, Ladiga was arrested and  sentenced to death.  He was executed while being transported to Siberia, aged 47.

References
 

1893 births
1941 deaths
People from Panevėžys County
Russian military personnel of World War I
Lithuanian people of World War I
Lithuanian generals
Lithuanian people executed by the Soviet Union